Boomer's Story is the third studio album by American roots rock musician Ry Cooder, released in 1972.

Track listing

Side one
 "Boomer's Story" (listed as "Traditional," actually Carson Robison) – 4:13
 "Cherry Ball Blues" (instrumental) (Skip James) – 4:10
 "Crow Black Chicken" (Lawrence Wilson) – 2:14
 "Ax Sweet Mama" (Sleepy John Estes) – 4:23
 "Maria Elena" (instrumental) (Bob Russell, Lorenzo Barcelata) – 4:30

Side two
 "The Dark End of the Street" (instrumental) (Dan Penn, Chips Moman) – 3:25
 "Rally 'Round the Flag" (George F. Root) – 3:34
 "Comin' In on a Wing and a Prayer" (Jimmy McHugh, Harold Adamson) – 3:00
 "President Kennedy" (Sleepy John Estes) – 4:39
 "Good Morning Mr. Railroad Man" (Traditional) – 4:30

Notes 
The title track was previously recorded as "The Railroad Boomer" by Bud Billings (aka Frank Luther) and Carson Robison in a performance recorded at the studio at Liederkranz Hall in New York on September 9, 1929  (Victor V-40139). Although it is credited on Cooder's album as "traditional," Robison was awarded a copyright and the song "can't be shown to have circulated in oral tradition." Gene Autry recorded it in December of the same year. In the 1930s the song was recorded for Decca Records by the Rice Brothers' Gang, in 1939 by Roy Acuff & His Smoky Mountain Boys, in 1941 by Riley Puckett for RCA, and in the 1950s by Cisco Houston (as "The Rambler") and by the New Lost City Ramblers, who included Cooder's guitar teacher Tom Paley.

Personnel
 Ry Cooder - guitars, mandolin, bottleneck guitar, vocals
 Tommy McClure - bass
 Charles Lawing - clarinet
 Jim Keltner, Roger Hawkins - drums
 Sleepy John Estes - guitar and vocals on "President Kennedy" (recorded in Collierville, Tennessee)
 Gene Finney - harmonica
 George Bohanon - horns
 Milt Holland - percussion
 Randy Newman - piano on "Rally 'Round the Flag" 
 Jim Dickinson - piano, bass, backing vocals
 Dan Penn - backing vocals
Technical
Judy Maizel - production assistant
Jerry Masters, John Fry, Lee Herschberg, Richard Rosebrough - engineer
Susan Titelman - photography

Notes

1972 albums
Ry Cooder albums
Albums produced by Lenny Waronker
Albums produced by Jim Dickinson
Reprise Records albums
Albums recorded at Muscle Shoals Sound Studio